The nuclear receptor co-repressor 2 is a transcriptional coregulatory protein that contains several nuclear receptor-interacting domains.  In addition,  NCOR2 appears to recruit histone deacetylases to DNA promoter regions.  Hence NCOR2 assists nuclear receptors in the down regulation of target gene expression. NCOR2 is also referred to as a silencing mediator for retinoid or thyroid-hormone receptors (SMRT) or T3 receptor-associating cofactor 1 (TRAC-1).

Function 
NCOR2/SMRT is a transcriptional coregulatory protein that contains several modulatory functional domains including multiple autonomous repression domains as well as two or three C-terminal nuclear receptor-interacting domains. NCOR2/SMRT serves as a repressive coregulatory factor (corepressor) for multiple transcription factor pathways.  In this regard, NCOR2/SMRT functions as a platform protein, facilitating the recruitment of histone deacetylases to the DNA promoters bound by its interacting transcription factors.

Family
It is a member of the family of nuclear receptor corepressors; the other human protein that is a member of that family is Nuclear receptor co-repressor 1.

Discovery 
SMRT was initially cloned and characterized in the laboratory of Dr. Ronald M. Evans at the Salk Institute for Biological Studies.  In another early investigation into this molecule, similar findings were reported in a variant referred to as TRAC-1.

Interactions 

Nuclear receptor co-repressor 2 has been shown to interact with:

 AR, 
 BCL6, 
 C-Fos, 
 C-jun, 
 HDAC1, 
 HDAC3, 
 HDAC4, 
 HDAC5, 
 HDAC10, 
 MeCP2,
 NR4A1, 
 POU2F1, 
 PPARD, 
 PGR, 
 PML
 RBPJ, 
 RELA, 
 RUNX1T1, 
 RARA, 
 SIN3A, 
 SNW1, 
 SPEN, 
 SRF, 
 TBL1X, 
 THRB,
 VDR, and
 ZBTB16.

References

Further reading

External links 
 
 

Transcription coregulators